This was the first edition of the tournament.

Ruben Bemelmans and Daniel Masur won the title by walkover after Marc-Andrea Hüsler and Dominic Stricker withdrew before the final.

Seeds

Draw

References

External links
 Main draw

Challenger Biel/Bienne - Doubles